The Dry Creek School in Manhattan, Montana is a balloon-framed one-room schoolhouse that was built in 1902.  It was listed on the National Register of Historic Places in 1981.

It has a recessed entry door and a cupola, and it was used as a community center.

It was one of 13 one-room schoolhouses in Gallatin County, Montana that were listed on the National Register together in July 1981, and three more were listed later.

References

School buildings on the National Register of Historic Places in Montana
School buildings completed in 1902
Defunct schools in Montana
Schools in Gallatin County, Montana
1902 establishments in Montana
National Register of Historic Places in Gallatin County, Montana
One-room schoolhouses in Montana
Community centers in Montana